Harpalus ussuriensis is a species of ground beetle in the subfamily Harpalinae. It was described by Maximilien Chaudoir in 1863.

References

ussuriensis
Beetles described in 1863